Chrysis mediata  is a Palearctic species of   cuckoo wasp.

References

External links
Images representing  Chrysis mediata 

Hymenoptera of Europe
Chrysididae
Insects described in 1951